The Visby class was a Swedish World War II destroyer class. The ships were  a part of Sweden's military buildup during the war. Under this period the ships were used as neutral guards and escort ships. In 1965 the ships were modified and rebuilt as frigates. Two of the ships were decommissioned in 1978 and the last two followed in 1982.

Orders 
During the first years of the War Sweden's armed forces went through a massive reinforcement. In 1941, as part of this build-up, the Swedish government ordered four new destroyers for the Swedish navy, of which two were replacements for three destroyers sunk in an explosion on 17 September that year. The new class would be based on the older  that were classified as a "Town-class destroyer" and because of this classified as "Modified Town-class destroyers", (modifierad Stadsjagare). In total four ships were built, two at the Götaverken-shipyard and two at the Eriksbergs shipyard.

Design 
The design was largely based on the Göteborg-class destroyer, with a similar main armament of three  M/24 Bofors guns in three single mounts, but in an improved arrangement, with the second gun mounted aft, firing over the third gun rather than between the funnels as in the earlier destroyers, thus improving fields of fire. Anti-aircraft armament was also improved, consisting of four Bofors 40 mm guns in a twin mount on the ship's centreline between the banks of torpedo tubes, and two single mounts mounted port and starboard further forward. These were supplemented by several 20 mm cannon, also by Bofors. The ships' torpedo armament remained six  torpedo tubes in two triple mounts. The ships were fitted for minelaying, with up to 20 mines being carried, while anti-submarine armament consisted of four depth charge throwers.

Displacement was  standard and  full load. A square stern was fitted. Like the Göteborg class, the superstructure was built using light alloys to save weight.

Rebuilds 

From 1957 to 1959, Hälsingborg and Kalmar were modified, removing the aft set of torpedo tubes and replacing the forward triple mount with a quintuple set of tubes. From 1964, Visby and Sundsvall underwent a much more expensive reconstruction, being completely rearmed. As recommissioned on 14 October 1966, the two destroyers were armed with two Bofors  anti-aircraft guns, one forward and one aft, with a quadruple  Bofors anti-submarine rocket launcher replacing the torpedo tubes. The ships' bridges were enlarged and a platform for a helicopter fitted. The ships' radar fit was also updated.

All four ships were redesignated as frigates on 1 January 1965.

Decommissioning 
In the 1970s the Swedish government decided that the navy would give up its blue-water navy capacity and become a more coast-based navy. All frigates and destroyers were decommissioned. The first two Visby-class frigates left the navy in 1978 and in 1982 the remaining two followed. HSwMS Visby and HSwMS Sundsvall were used as target ships before being sold to Spain for scrapping.

Ships

References

Notes

Citations

Sources
 
 
 
 

 
Destroyer classes